Solenofilomorpha justinei is a species of acoel found in New Caledonia.

References

Fauna of New Caledonia
Acoelomorphs